Holy Week is the first studio album by the English multi-instrumentalist Duke Garwood. It was released through Loog Records on 12 September 2005.

Track listing

References

Duke Garwood albums
2005 albums